The 1999 Missouri Valley Conference men's basketball tournament was played after the conclusion of the 1998–1999 regular season at the Kiel Center in St. Louis, Missouri.

The Creighton Bluejays defeated the Evansville Purple Aces in the championship game, 70–61, and as a result won their 5th MVC Tournament title and earned an automatic bid to the 1999 NCAA tournament. Rodney Buford of Creighton was named the tournament MVP.

Tournament Bracket

See also
 Missouri Valley Conference

References 

1998–99 Missouri Valley Conference men's basketball season
Missouri Valley Conference men's basketball tournament
1999 in sports in Missouri
College basketball tournaments in Missouri
Basketball competitions in St. Louis